Andrea "Andy" Erikson (born February 2, 1987) is a stand-up comedian known as one of the top five finalists on the 2015 season of the TV show Last Comic Standing.

In addition she is outspoken against misogyny in comedy, Marfan Syndrome awareness, and has worked to help the advancement of comedy clubs.

Now living in Los Angeles, Erickson and comic Amber Preston (a fellow Minnesota transplant) co-host a weekly comedy showcase, Punchline Punchout, at the Hollywood Improv; similar to a game show in format, the showcase gives comics 10 minutes to come up with punchlines on a given topic.

Discography
 Secret Unicorn (2015)

Filmography

References

External links
 

1987 births
Living people
American stand-up comedians
People from Ham Lake, Minnesota
American women comedians
Comedians from Minnesota
21st-century American comedians
21st-century American women